The 2019 season was the Jacksonville Jaguars' 25th in the National Football League (NFL) and their third under head coach Doug Marrone.

The Jaguars signed quarterback Nick Foles to a four-year, $88 million contract on March 11, 2019. It was also their first season since 2013 without Blake Bortles on the roster, as Bortles signed with the defending NFC champion Los Angeles Rams in free agency on March 18, 2019. Foles suffered a clavicle injury in week 1, and was replaced with rookie Gardner Minshew for the majority of the season. The Jaguars slightly improved on their 5–11 record from the previous season, but were mathematically eliminated from playoff contention for the second consecutive season after a loss to the Los Angeles Chargers.

This season, the Jags became the first team since the 1986 Tampa Bay Buccaneers to lose 5 straight games by 17 points or more.

Unrestricted free agents

Acquisitions

Draft

Pre-draft trades
The Rams traded their third-round selection as well as their 2020 fifth-round selection to Jacksonville in exchange for defensive end Dante Fowler.
Jacksonville traded their fifth-round selection to Cleveland in exchange for running back Carlos Hyde.
Jacksonville traded a conditional seventh-round selection to Cleveland in exchange for quarterback Cody Kessler.
Jacksonville traded center Luke Bowanko to Baltimore in exchange for Baltimore's seventh-round selection.

Draft day trades
Oakland traded their second-, fifth-, and seventh-round selections to Jacksonville in exchange for Jacksonville's second- and fourth-round selections.
Seattle traded their 2020 sixth-round selection to Jacksonville in exchange for Jacksonville's seventh-round selection (#236 overall).

Staff

Final roster

Preseason

Regular season

Schedule

Note: Intra-division opponents are in bold text.

Game summaries

Week 1: vs. Kansas City Chiefs

Week 2: at Houston Texans

Week 3: vs. Tennessee Titans

Week 4: at Denver Broncos

Week 5: at Carolina Panthers

Week 6: vs. New Orleans Saints

Week 7: at Cincinnati Bengals

Week 8: vs. New York Jets

Week 9: vs. Houston Texans
NFL London Games

Week 11: at Indianapolis Colts

Week 12: at Tennessee Titans

Week 13: vs. Tampa Bay Buccaneers

Week 14: vs. Los Angeles Chargers

Week 15: at Oakland Raiders

Week 16: at Atlanta Falcons

Week 17: vs. Indianapolis Colts

Standings

Division

Conference

References

External links

Jacksonville
Jacksonville Jaguars seasons
Jacksonville Jaguars